was a dentist and the Chairman of the Japan Dental Association.

He was one of the founders of Takayama Dental School (高山歯科医学院), which was later named Tokyo Dental College (東京歯科大学).

He was known as Hideyo Noguchi's patron.

There is a monument at his name in Abiko, Chiba.

References

External links
Chiwaki Morinosuke HP

Japanese dentists
1870 births
1947 deaths
People from Chiba Prefecture